Chu Chung-shing (born 1958) is an ivory sculptor based in Hong Kong. He is the founder of Prestige Crafts, an art studio located on Hollywood Road in Hong Kong. Chu is known for his elaborate carvings made from mammoth tusks.

Biography
Chu was born in Xinyi, Guangdong in 1958. He moved to Hong Kong at the age of 23 to work as an ivory sculpting apprentice. In 1989, after a ban on international elephant ivory trade, Chu began working on mammoth tusks supplied from Siberia. Three years later he opened his art studio, Prestige Crafts.

Selected exhibitions
2010: World Expo
2012: Great Hall of the People
2013: Hong Kong Convention and Exhibition Centre

References

People from Maoming
1958 births
Hong Kong artists
Living people
Artists from Guangdong